Raidió na Life 106.4FM (meaning "Liffey Radio") is an Irish-language radio station founded in 1993 and broadcasting in County Dublin, Ireland. In addition to being transmitted on FM, the station's output is available worldwide via the internet.

History 
The first independent Irish-language radio station, Raidió na Life 102, came on the air in September 1993 covering Dublin and some neighbouring areas. It broadcasts under licence from the Broadcasting Authority of Ireland. Comharchumann Raidió Átha Cliath Teoranta, which was set up in 1989, is the organisation which owns and operates Raidió na Life 106.4fm. In October 2017, the station moved from the offices of 7 Merrion Square to new purpose built studios in the new headquarters of Foras na Gaeilge, located at 63-66 Amiens Street on the north side of the city.

Comharchumann Raidió Átha Cliath Teoranta 
Comharchumann Raidió Átha Cliath Teoranta (CRÁCT) is the cooperative that was founded on 4 July 1989 as a non-profit organisation to oversee the application for the setting up and operation of Raidió na Life. Membership of CRÁCT is open to anyone who purchases a share in the station. CRÁCT currently has 380 shareholders and is under the direction of the Board of Management.

See also
Raidió Fáilte - Similar station in Belfast
List of Irish-language media
List of Celtic-language media

References

External links
 Raidió na Life official website

Radio stations in the Republic of Ireland
Community radio stations in Ireland
Irish-language radio stations
1993 establishments in Ireland
Radio stations established in 1993